Art Uallach Ua Ruairc (died 1046) was King of Connacht.

References

 Leabhar na nGenealach, Dublin, 2004-2005
 Annals of the Four Masters, ed. John O'Donovan, Dublin, 1856
 Annals of Lough Ce, ed. W.M. Hennessey, London, 1871.
 Irish Kings and High Kings, Francis John Byrne, 3rd revised edition, Dublin: Four Courts Press, 2001. 
 "Ua Ruairc", in Seán Duffy (ed.), Medieval Ireland: An Encyclopedia. Routledge. 2005. pp. 

1046 deaths
Kings of Connacht
People from County Cavan
People from County Leitrim
11th-century Irish monarchs
Year of birth unknown